The women's 69 kg event at the 2017 Summer Universiade was held on 23 August at the Tamkang University Shao-Mo Memorial Gymnasium 7F.

Records 
Prior to this competition, the existing world and Universiade records were as follows.

 Initial records

Results

References 

2017 in women's weightlifting
Women's 69 kg